Thiruvankulam is a suburb of the city of Kochi, in the state of Kerala, India. It is a part of Tripunithura Municipality and Kochi metropolitan area. In the days of the Kochi and Travancore kingdoms, Thiruvankulam was a border village. The Kavaleeshwaram stream, now a canal, separated the two kingdoms. The Kochi - Madurai National Highway (NH 49) passes through Thiruvankulam. It is a major fork junction on the highway from Kochi, going east towards Muvattupuzha and south towards Kottayam. Karingachira serves as a terminus of the Airport–Seaport road connecting Nedumbaseery and the Kochi port.

Thiruvankulam's proximity to the city as well as industrial areas comprising the Kochi refineries and allied industries have contributed to its growth. The economic spurt in Kochi has resulted in Thiruvankulam emerging as a preferred residential area. This has resulted in a large increase in the village population, bringing it into a status of a small town.

Etymology
The name "Thiruvankulam" is derived from the word Thiru-vayaram-kulam. The legend behind this name is related to Lord Shiva and Parasurama Muni.  The Siva temple at Thiruvankulam is one out of four other Siva temples, Parasurama Muni had built consecutively. Other 3 temples are Kureekkad, Perunninakulam and Trikkathara. It is believed that Muni saw Siva lying spread across all these places. So he built temples at places where he saw Siva's head, nabhi, stomach and leg.  The "Prathishta" in Thrivankulam Temple is considered as "Swayambhoo" - self-born.

Demographics
Thiruvankulam is a census town in Ernakulam district in the Indian state of Kerala. As of 2001 India census, Thiruvankulam had a population of 21,713. Males constitute 50% of the population and females 50%. Thiruvankulam has an average literacy rate of 96%, higher than the national average of 59.5%: male literacy is 96.5%, and female literacy is 95.5%. In Thiruvankulam, 8% of the population is under 6 years of age.

Administration

Thiruvankulam is in Piravom assembly constituency.Thiruvankulam was administered by a special grade panchayat (village or non-urban habitation) under the Kerala Panchayati Raj Act. In 2010, as a result of the re-organization of administrative divisions in Kerala, Thiruvankulam panchayat merged with the neighbouring Tripunithura Municipality.

Places to visit

Hill Palace
Hill Palace is a large archaeological museum in Kerala situated in Thiruvankulam. It was the administrative office of the princely state of Kochi. The complex has an archaeological museum, a heritage museum, a deer park, a 'prehistoric' park and a children's park. The land surrounding the Hill Palace has rare Medicinal Plants as it used to be a medicinal garden nurtured by the royal gardeners.

The palace has been converted into a museum and is open to public all days except Mondays from 9:00 am to 12:30 pm and 2:00 pm to 4:30 pm.

A very well known Malayalam movie, Manichitrathazhu was shot in this palace.

Karingachira Church
A Jacobite Syrian Church was built in 722 AD near Hill Palace, Tripunitura. The church is named after Saint George. The Katthanar (Vicar) of Karingachira was considered the representative of the Nazarani community of the erstwhile Cochin State.
The Saint Parumala Thirumeni was ordained as a deacon in this church in 1857 AD.

This church was elevated as a cathedral by Patriarch Ignatius Zakka I Iwas in 2004.

Economic activities
The village is home to large petroleum corporations as well as numerous small scale and cottage industries. TRACO Cable Company, a cable manufacturer, as well major oil corporations like Bharat Petroleum, Indian Oil Corporation, Hindustan Petroleum have their presence there. Agriculture, though it has fallen from the status of the prime means of livelihood in Thiruvankulam, is still in good shape. The major produces include coconuts, arecanuts, nutmeg, and pepper. Rice cultivation is on the decline.

Most people are employed in the city of Kochi, major employers being the Kochi Refineries, HOC, FACT and the government of Kerala.

References

External links
Thiruvamkulam.com
Thiruvankulam.net
Aiskochi.com

Cities and towns in Ernakulam district
Suburbs of Kochi